was a Japanese samurai, calligrapher, and author.

Biography
Born in Edo, Japan, as the second son of the hatamoto .

In 1855, Seizan died of illness at the age of 26, and Ono Tetsutarō, a student of his, married into the Yamaoka family. Taking the family name, Ono became Yamaoka Tesshū.

In 1856, Deishū became an instructor of spearmanship at the Kōbusho. Later, in 1862, he accompanied Hitotsubashi Yoshinobu to Edo.

In 1866, he was assigned to head the newly established  commando unit. At the outbreak of the Boshin War in 1868, Deishū fought in the Battle of Toba–Fushimi. After the defeat of the Shogunal forces there, he returned to Edo where he attempted to rally for loyalty to Yoshinobu. On March 5 of that year, Deishū was part of the guard regiment that accompanied Yoshinobu's retreat from Edo Castle to the Kan'ei-ji in Ueno. On May 3, in the aftermath of the Fall of Edo, he remained alongside Yoshinobu during the latter's move to the Mito Domain.

After the conclusion of the war, Yoshinobu chose Deishū as his emissary to Saigō Takamori for the negotiation of the disposal of the Tokugawa family due to his resolute character. However, Deishū recommended that his brother-in-law, Yamaoka Tesshū, conduct the negotiations instead.

Later, when the Tokugawa family moved from Edo to Shizuoka, he moved with them and temporarily took stewardship of Tanaka Castle, a Tokugawa property. After the abolition of the han system, he resigned his post and settled into a secluded retirement in Tokyo. He spent the remainder of his life appraising calligraphy, paintings, and antiques.

He died at his home in 1903.

Bibliography

References

1835 births
1903 deaths
Samurai
Hatamoto
People of the Boshin War
Meiji Restoration
19th-century Japanese calligraphers
Japanese Buddhists